The 2016 CopperWynd Pro Women's Challenge was a professional tennis tournament played on outdoor hard courts. It was the 2nd edition of the tournament and part of the 2016 ITF Women's Circuit, offering a total of $50,000 in prize money. It took place in Scottsdale, Arizona, United States, on 31 October–6 November 2016.

Singles main draw entrants

Seeds 

 1 Rankings as of 24 October 2016.

Other entrants 
The following player received a wildcard into the singles main draw:
  Laura Ashley
  Ellie Halbauer
  Chiara Scholl

The following players received entry from the qualifying draw:
  Claire Liu
  Sanaz Marand
  Kylie McKenzie
  Alyona Sotnikova

The following player received entry by a lucky loser spot:
 Brynn Boren

The following player received entry by a special exempt:
  Danielle Collins

Champions

Singles

 Beatriz Haddad Maia def.  Kristie Ahn, 7–6(7–4), 7–6(7–2)

Doubles

 Ingrid Neel /  Taylor Townsend def.  Samantha Crawford /  Melanie Oudin, 6–4, 6–3

External links 
 2016 CopperWynd Pro Women's Challenge at ITFtennis.com
 Official website

2016 ITF Women's Circuit
2016 in American tennis
Tennis tournaments in the United States
Tennis tournaments in Arizona
2016 in sports in Arizona